The Tip O'Neill Award is given annually to a Canadian baseball player who is "judged to have excelled in individual achievement and team contribution while adhering to the highest ideals of the game of baseball." The award was created by the Canadian Baseball Hall of Fame and first presented in 1984.  It is named after James "Tip" O'Neill, one of the earliest Canadian stars in Major League Baseball (MLB).

Larry Walker, Jason Bay, Joey Votto, and Justin Morneau are the only players to win the Tip O'Neill Award at least three times. Walker won the award nine times, and Votto has won it seven times.  Six winners – Walker, Bay, Terry Puhl, Rob Ducey, Ryan Dempster, and Corey Koskie – are members of the Canadian Baseball Hall of Fame. The award has been presented to one amateur player, Daniel Brabant. Walker, Votto, and Justin Morneau won the MLB Most Valuable Player (MVP) Award alongside the Tip O'Neill Award; the trio are the only Canadians to win the MLB MVP Award.  Éric Gagné, the 2002 and 2003 recipient, compiled a major league record of 84 consecutive save opportunities converted from 2002 to 2004 and won the Cy Young Award in 2003.  He and John Axford went on to win the Rolaids Relief Man Award in the same year as the Tip O'Neill Award. Bay became the first Canadian to win the Rookie of the Year Award, which he won the same year he won his first Tip O'Neill Award. Votto is the only award winner to also win the Hank Aaron Award.

Initially, the award was presented annually at either Rogers Centre in Toronto or Olympic Stadium in Montreal, depending on which venue the award winner's team was scheduled to play at during the MLB season. However, as the Montreal Expos moved to Washington, D.C., and the Toronto Blue Jays do not host all the National League teams on an annual basis, the award has also been presented at the home park of the winning player.  Vladimir Guerrero Jr. of the Toronto Blue Jays was the 2021 recipient of the award and Jordan Romano is the 2022 recipient.

Winners

See also

Canadian baseball awards
Lionel Conacher Award
Lou Marsh Trophy

Notes

References
General

Specific

Baseball trophies and awards
Canadian sports trophies and awards
Awards established in 1984
Baseball in Canada
1984 establishments in Ontario